Pustkowo  is a village in the administrative district of Gmina Rewal, within Gryfice County, West Pomeranian Voivodeship, in north-western Poland. It is located on the Trzebiatowski Coast in the historic region of Pomerania.

The village has a population of 125 (as of 2010).

Gallery

References

Villages in Gryfice County
Populated coastal places in Poland
Seaside resorts in Poland